Commodore William Henry Alexander Macomb (June 16, 1818 – August 12, 1872) was an officer in the United States Navy who served during the American Civil War.

Biography
Born in Detroit, Michigan, Macomb was the son of Major General Alexander Macomb, who served as commanding general of the United States Army. He joined the navy in 1834 as a midshipman, and was promoted to lieutenant in 1847. He married Mary Eliza Stanton (his sister's step-daughter) on 17 January 1844 in Fort Hamilton, New York.

Macomb served with distinction during the Civil War, being promoted to commander in 1862. He took part in the riverine warfare along the Mississippi, commanded Shamrock in the North Atlantic Blockading Squadron, led the naval force which captured Plymouth, North Carolina, and led an expedition up the Roanoke River in North Carolina. For his gallantry in action with the North Atlantic Squadron, he was promoted to captain in 1866, and finally to commodore in 1870.

He was elected as a companion of the Pennsylvania Commandery of the Military Order of the Loyal Legion of the United States (MOLLUS) on September 19, 1866.  He was assigned MOLLUS insignia number 373.

Commodore Macomb died in Philadelphia, Pennsylvania.  He was buried at Woodlands Cemetery in Philadelphia.

Namesake
In 1941, the destroyer USS Macomb (DD-458) was named in honor of Commodore Macomb and his first cousin, Rear Admiral David B. Macomb (1827–1911).

References

1818 births
1872 deaths
Union Navy officers
United States Navy officers
People of Michigan in the American Civil War